Olive oil soap may refer to the following olive oil-based soaps:

Aleppo soap
Castile soap
Marseille soap
Nabulsi soap